Nationality words link to articles with information on the nation's poetry or literature (for instance, Irish or France).

Events
 January – English literary magazine Horizon is first published in London by Cyril Connolly, Peter Watson and Stephen Spender
 July 26 – Release of the movie adaptation of Jane Austen's Pride and Prejudice with English poet and writer Aldous Huxley as a screenwriter
 English poet Basil Bunting joins the Royal Air Force and is eventually sent to Iran as an intelligence officer and translator
 Russian poet Anna Akhmatova's collection From Six Books is published in the Soviet Union but publication is suspended shortly after release, copies pulped and remaining issues prohibited
 American poet Louis Zukofsky finishes the first half of A

Works published
Listed by nation where the work was first published and again by the poet's native land, if different; works listed again if substantially revised:

India, in English
 Mohendra Nath Dutt, Kurukshetra ( Poetry in English ), an epic; Calcutta: P. M. Mukherji
 P. R. Kaikini, The Recruit ( Poetry in English ), Bombay: New Book Co.
 Manjeri Sundaraman, Catguts ( Poetry in English ), Madras: Hurley Press

Canada
 A. M. Klein, Hath Not a Jew.
 E. J. Pratt, Brebeuf and his Brethren, Toronto: Macmillan, 1940. Detroit: Basilian Press, 1942. Governor General's Award 1940.

United Kingdom
 W. H. Auden English poet living at this time in the United States:
 Another Time, including "September 1, 1939"
 Some Poems
 John Betjeman, Old Lights for New Chancels
 R. N. Currey, Tiresias
 Cecil Day-Lewis:
 translation, The Georgics of Virgil (see also his translations of The Aeneid of Virgil 1952 and The Eclogues of Virgil 1963)
 Poems in Wartime
 T. S. Eliot:
 The Waste Land, and Other Poems, The Waste Land first published in 1923
 East Coker, published in The New English Weekly, Easter Number; published in book form in June; republished in Four Quartets 1944
 William Empson, The Gathering Storm
 Roy Fuller, Poems
 Robert Garioch, pen name of Robert Garioch Sutherland and Sorley MacLean, also known as Somhairle MacGill-Eain, 17 Poems for 6d. in Gaelic, Lowland Scots and English
 Rayner Heppenstall, Blind Men's Flowers are Green
 Hugh MacDiarmid, editor, The Golden Treasury of Scottish Poetry
 Louis MacNeice, The Last Ditch, including "The Coming of War" sequence, Northern Ireland poet published in Ireland
 Alice Meynell (died 1922), The Poems of Alice Meynell, complete edition
 R. F. Patterson, Mein Rant: a summary in light verse of "Mein Kampf"
 William Plomer, Selected Poems
 Stephen Spender, Selected Poems
 Dylan Thomas, Portrait of the Artist as a Young Dog
 Henry Treece, 38 Poems
 W. B. Yeats (died 1939), Last Poems and Plays

United States
 Conrad Aiken, And in the Human Heart
 W. H. Auden English poet living at this time in the United States:
 Another Time, including the famous "September 1, 1939"
 Some Poems
 Leonard Bacon, Sunderland Capture
 Stephen Vincent Benét, Nightmare at Noon
 Witter Bynner, Against the Cold
 John Ciardi, Homeward to America
 E. E. Cummings, 50 Poems
 Richard Eberhart, Song and Idea
 Kenneth Fearing, Collected Poems
 Robert Hayden, Heart-Shape in the Dust
 Phyllis McGinley, A Pocketful of Wry
 Edna St. Vincent Millay, Make Bright the Arrows
 Ogden Nash, The Face is Familiar
 Ezra Pound, Cantos LII–LXXI
 Frederic Prokosch, Death at Sea
 Kenneth Rexroth, In What Hour
 Elizabeth Madox Roberts, Song in the Meadow

Other in English
 E. H. McCormick, Letters and Art in New Zealand, scholarship
 Ewart Milne, Letter from Ireland, Irish poet published in Ireland

Works published in other languages
Listed by nation where the work was first published and again by the poet's native land, if different; works listed again if substantially revised:

France
 Louis Aragon, Le Crève-cœur
 Paul Éluard, pen name of Eugène Grindel, Le Livre ouvert, published from this year to 1941; France
 Pierre Reverdy, Plein Verre, France

Greece
 Odysseus Elytis's first book, Orientations
 Giorgos Seferis:
 Τετράδιο Γυμνασμάτων ("Exercise Book")
 Ημερολόγιο Καταστρώματος Ι ("Deck Diary I")

Indian subcontinent
Including all of the British colonies that later became India, Pakistan, Bangladesh, Sri Lanka. Listed alphabetically by first name, regardless of surname:

Bengali
 Premendra Mitra, Samrat
 Rabindranath Tagore:
 Nabajatak, with themes and images from urban and industrial life (such as radios, railways and airplanes), a sharp contrast to the rural and natural themes of traditional Bengali poetry
 Rogsayyay, written during his illness and with many images of sickness and worry, but without despondency (see also Arogya 1941, called a "companion volume" with a contrasting mood)
 Sanai, poems with a nostalgic tone
 Chelebela, autobiography concerning the author's childhood
 Samar Sen, Grahan o Anyana Kabita, Indian, Bengali-language
 Subhash Mukhopadhyay, Padatik, poems reflecting Marxist ideology and politics in general, with a combination of lyricism and sloganeering; the consonance and speech-like rhythm of these poems became popular and influential in Bengali poetry
 V. K. Gokak, also known as "Vinayaka", Samudra Gitagalu, poems about the potency and loveliness of the sea; the poems experiment with new diction and meters, including free verse

Hindi
 Narendra Sharma, Palas Van, mostly sensuous poems of love and beauty
 Ramadhari Singh Dinakar, Rasavanti
 Ayodhya Singh Upadhyay, also known as "Hariandha", Vaidehi Vanavas, based on Sita's exile

Kannada
 B. R. Bendre, also known as Ambikatanaya Datta, Sahitya Samsodhana, literary criticism on some older works of Kannada literature
 Muliya Timmappayya, Navanita Ramayana, the Ramayana in ragale meter
 S. V. Parameshwara Bhatt, Ragini, 28 love poems

Urdu
 Muhiuddin Qadri Zor, Ruh-i tanqid, introduction  to principles of Western literary criticism
 Nasiruddin Hashmi, Khavatin-i Dakan Ki Urdu Khidmat, literary history on women Urdu writers from Deccan
 Syed Mohammad Hasnain, Jauhar-i-Iqbal, literary criticism in Urdu on the poetry of Sir Muhammad Iqbal's Urdu poetry

Other Indian languages

 Ahad Zargar, Tarana-e-Ahad Zargar, Sufistic ghazals and vatsans; Kashmiri
 Dimbeshwar Neog, Asamiya Sahityar Buranjit Bhumuki, a comprehensive review of early Assamese literature; criticism
 K. V. Jaganathan, Tamilkkavyankal, literary history of Tamil epics, compared to the traditions of Sanskrit poetry and world literature
 Kavi Nhanalal, Kuruksetra, final part of a 12-canto, Gujarati epic about the war of the Mahabharat, written in poetic prose, interspersed with songs (first canto published 1926)
 Maiyilai Seeni Venkataswamy, Pauttamum Tamilum, literary history on the influence of Buddhism on Tamil culture and literature
 N. M. Sant and Indira Sant, a poet and couple publishing together; N. M. Sant's poems show influences from Madhav Julian, Indira Sant's reflect folklore; Marathi
 Prahlad Parekh, Bari Bahar, called a "milestone in the history of Gujarati poetry of the post-Gandhian era" by Indian academic Siser Kumar Das
 Sankarambadi Sundarachari, popular "prayer song" in Andhra, originally written for a film that was never completed, a record of the song was published, and its popularity led the government of Andhra Pradesh to declare it a prayer song to be sung along with Vandemataram

Spanish language

Spain
 Gerardo Diego, Angeles de Compostela ("Angels of Compostela"), 42 sonnets on diverse topics
 Federico García Lorca (died 1936), Poeta en Nueva York ("A Poet in New York"), written in 1930 (first translation into English in 1988)
 Dionisio Ridruejo, Poesía en armas ("Poetry in Arms")

Other in Spanish
 César Vallejo (died 1938), España, aparta de mí este cáliz ("Spain, Take This Cup from Me"), Peruvian poet published in Mexico after the first attempt at publication was interrupted during the Spanish Civil War and all copies lost (that edition was printed by soldiers of the Army of the East, on paper they themselves had made)
 José Varallanos, Elegia en el mundo, Peruvian

Awards and honors
 Pulitzer Prize for Poetry: Mark Van Doren: Collected Poems
 King's Gold Medal for Poetry: Michael Thwaites
 Governor General's Award, poetry or drama: Brébeuf and his Brethren, E. J. Pratt

Births
Death years link to the corresponding "[year] in poetry" article:
 January 30 – Sterling D. Plumpp, African-American
 February 9 – Seamus Deane (died 2021), Irish poet, novelist and academic
 April 11 – Emmanuel Hocquard (died 2019), French
 April 16 – Rolf Dieter Brinkmann (died 1975), German
 April 25 – Peter Wild (died 2009), American poet and historian, professor at the University of Arizona in Tucson
 May 7 – Angela Carter, née Stalker (died 1992), English novelist and poet
 May 24 – Joseph Brodsky, born Iosif Aleksandrovich Brodsky (died 1996), Russian-born American poet and essayist, winner of the Nobel Prize in Literature (1987) and Poet Laureate of the United States (1991–1992)
 June 13 – David Budbill (died 2016), American poet and playwright
 June 23 – Amal Abul-Qassem Donqol (died 1983), Egyptian Arabic poet
 August 14 – Judith Kazantzis, née Pakenham (died 2018), English poet and activist
 September 2 – Harry Northup, American poet and actor
 September 8 – Jack Prelutsky, American poet noted for children's poems
 September 10 – John Curl, American poet, memoirist, translator, author, activist and historian
 October 11 – David McFadden (died 2018), Canadian poet and travel writer
 October 15 –  Fanny Howe, American poet, novelist and short story writer and recipient of the 2009 Ruth Lilly Poetry Prize
 October 20 – Robert Pinsky, American poet and Poet Laureate of the United States (1997–2000)
 November 1 – William Heyen, American poet, editor and literary critic
 November 5 – Dmitri Prigov (died 2007), Russian poet
 November 19 – Peter Cooley, American poet and academic
 December 14 – Carolyn Rodgers (died 2010), American poet, leading participant of the Black Arts Movement of the 1960s and 1970s and founder of one of the country's oldest and largest black-owned book publishers
 December 21
 Kelly Cherry, American writer
 Rolf Sagen (died 2017), Norwegian writer
Also:
 Martha Collins, American
 Michael Jackson, New Zealand anthropologist and poet
 Paul Mariani, American poet and academic
 Pattiann Rogers, American
 Andrew Waterman, English poet and academic

Deaths
Birth years link to the corresponding "[year] in poetry" article:
 January 5 – Humbert Wolfe (born 1885), British poet and epigrammist
 March 4 – Hamlin Garland (born 1860), American novelist, poet, essayist and short story writer
 March 7 – Edwin Markham (born 1852), American poet
 March 23 – Minakami Takitarō 水上滝太郎 pen name of Abe Shōzō (born 1887),  Shōwa period Japanese poet, novelist, literary critic and essayist (surname: Minakami)
 May 18 – Jacob Hiegentlich (born 1907), gay Dutch Jewish writer who also wrote poetry in German, suicide
 June 21 – Hendrik Marsman (born 1899), Dutch poet (died in sinking of SS Berenice)
 August 21 – Ernest Thayer (born 1863), American writer and poet who wrote "Casey at the Bat"
 September 26 – W. H. Davies (born 1871), Welsh-born poet and writer who spent most of his life as a tramp in the United States and United Kingdom, but became known as one of the most popular poets of his time
 October 11 – Taneda Santōka 種田 山頭火 pen name of Taneda Shōichi 種田 正 (born 1882), Japanese author and haiku poet (surname: Taneda)
 December 27 – Ella Rhoads Higginson (born 1862), American poet

See also

 Poetry
 List of poetry awards
 List of years in poetry

Notes

20th-century poetry
Poetry